"Emoticons" is a song by English indie rock band The Wombats. It was the fifth single to be released from their third album Glitterbug. Unlike previous Glitterbug singles, the music video for "Emoticons" heavily features the band themselves, performing at the Hordern Pavilion in Sydney.

Track listing

Critical reception
IndieLondon gave the song four out of five stars, and named it single of the week. They said it "captures The Wombats' innate ability to contrast uplifting sounds with darker lyrical themes" and is "arguably the best release yet from the band's current album".

References

2015 singles
The Wombats songs
2015 songs
14th Floor Records singles
Songs written by Matthew Murphy
Songs written by Tord Øverland Knudsen
Songs written by Dan Haggis